Cody Michael Wichmann (born March 2, 1992) is a former American football offensive guard. He played college football at Fresno State.

College career
Wichmann started in 50 career games at Fresno State, the second most starts by any Bulldog in the eight years. A two-time All-Mountain West selection, he garnered second-team accolades as a senior in 2014 and honorable mention in 2013. He majored in criminology-law enforcement at Fresno State.

Professional career

St. Louis / Los Angeles Rams

Wichmann was drafted by the St. Louis Rams in the sixth round (215th overall) of the 2015 NFL Draft. He played in 12 games with 7 starts as a rookie. In 2016, he played in 12 games with 11 starts at guard for the Rams.

On September 2, 2017, Wichmann was waived by the Rams.

Tennessee Titans
On September 12, 2017, Wichmann was signed to the Tennessee Titans' practice squad. He signed a reserve/future contract with the Titans on January 15, 2018.

On September 1, 2018, Wichmann was waived by the Titans.

Dallas Cowboys
On September 4, 2018, Wichmann was signed to the Dallas Cowboys' practice squad. He signed a reserve/future contract with the Cowboys on January 15, 2019. He was placed on the injured reserve list with a calf injury on August 31, 2019.

On September 4, 2020, Wichmann was released by the Cowboys.

References

External links
 Fresno State Bulldogs bio

Living people
1992 births
People from Mariposa, California
Players of American football from Tucson, Arizona
American football offensive guards
Fresno State Bulldogs football players
St. Louis Rams players
Los Angeles Rams players
Tennessee Titans players
Dallas Cowboys players